Alla Korot (born November 1, 1970) is a Ukrainian-American actress and dancer best known for her soap opera roles of Allie Doyle Martin on All My Children and Stacey Sloan on General Hospital: Night Shift.

Early life
Korot was born in Odessa, Ukrainian SSR, to Elena and Alex Korot. Korot and her family immigrated to the United States in 1977, and she subsequently grew up in San Francisco. Before acting, she performed for Ballet Celeste International with her family for six years. After touring, the family settled in California, where Korot won the title of California Miss T.E.E.N. in 1987. One of her very first acting appearances was opposite actor-musician, Scott Grimes in his music video, "I Don't Even Mind" in 1989.

Career

Film
Korot portrayed Angelique in Night of the Cyclone (1990), Sophia Petrenko in Domestic Import (2006), and  a Russian translator in Fracture (2007).

Television
In 1991, Korot moved to New York City and won the role of Jenna Norris on the soap opera Another World. She departed the series in December 1992. Korot guest starred in Parker Lewis Can't Lose, Diagnosis: Murder, ER, Charmed, 24, NCIS, and Castle. She had recurring roles on The District as Erin Vratalov, on the SOAPnet series General Hospital: Night Shift as Stacey Sloan and on Grimm as Dasha Karpushin.
.

Korot portrayed Allie Doyle Martin on All My Children (1997–1998). In December 2015, she announced she had joined the NBC soap, Days of Our Lives, in the role of Janet Bernard, and would begin filming in January 2016. That role lasted two episodes, June 29–30, 2016. On August 15, 2017, she landed Nurse Darya on General Hospital and appeared on September 20, 2017.

Korot was in the made-for-TV Movies The Colony as Jessica James, Gone But Not Forgotten as Lisa Darius, based on the novel of the same name by Phillip M. Margolin, and Jane Doe: Yes, I Remember It Well as Ursula Voss.

Cinematography
In 1996, Korot was a cinematographer–(Video Reference Cast) for The Hunchback of Notre Dame. based on the 1831 novel of the same name by  Victor Hugo.

Personal life
Korot is Jewish. She is married to a Russian-born Israeli, Yuval Selik, and the two co-launched L'uvalla, an Internet-based skin care business. The line can now be found at high end supermarkets. Korot continues to reside in her home in the state of California.

Filmography

Acting

Film

Television

Cinematography

References

External links
 
 

1970 births
American film actresses
American soap opera actresses
American television actresses
Living people
Jewish American actresses
Soviet emigrants to the United States
Soviet Jews
American people of Ukrainian descent
21st-century American Jews
21st-century American women